The 2016 ANA Inspiration was the 45th ANA Inspiration, held March 31 – April 3 at the Dinah Shore Tournament Course of Mission Hills Country Club in Rancho Mirage, California. It was its 34th year as a major championship. Golf Channel televised the event for the 6th consecutive year.

Lydia Ko won by one stroke over Chun In-gee and Charley Hull.

Field
Players who qualified for the event are listed below. Players are listed under the first category in which they qualified; additional qualifying categories are shown in parentheses.

1. Active LPGA Tour Hall of Fame members (must have participated in ten official LPGA Tour tournaments within the 12 months prior to the commitment deadline)

Juli Inkster (2,8), Karrie Webb (2,5,8)

2. Winners of all previous ANA Inspirations

Stacy Lewis (3,5,6,7,8,9), Brittany Lincicome (5,6,7,8,9), Inbee Park (3,5,6,7,8,9), Morgan Pressel (6,7,8,9), Lexi Thompson (5,6,7,8,9), Yani Tseng (3,8), Yoo Sun-young (8)

3. Winners of the U.S. Women's Open, Women's PGA Championship, and Ricoh Women's British Open in the previous five years

Choi Na-yeon (5,8,9), Chun In-gee (5,7,9,10), Shanshan Feng (5,6,7,8,9,10), Mo Martin (5,8), Ryu So-yeon (5,6,7,8,9), Michelle Wie (5,8)

Jiyai Shin (5,9) did not play.

4. Winners of The Evian Championship in the previous two years

Kim Hyo-joo (5,6,8,9), Lydia Ko (5,7,8,9)

5. Winners of official LPGA Tour tournaments from the 2013 Kraft Nabisco Championship through the week immediately preceding the 2016 ANA Inspiration

Brooke Henderson (7,9), M. J. Hur (8), Jang Ha-na (8,9), Jennifer Johnson, Cristie Kerr (8,9), Christina Kim (6,8), Kim Sei-young (6,7,8,9,12), Jessica Korda (8,9), Ilhee Lee (7,8), Lee Mi-hyang (6,7,8), Minjee Lee (8,9), Mirim Lee (6,8,9), Haru Nomura (8), Anna Nordqvist (6,8,9), Lee-Anne Pace (8), Park Hee-young (8), Suzann Pettersen (6,7,8,9), Beatriz Recari (8), Lizette Salas (8), Kris Tamulis (8), Amy Yang (7,8,9)

Teresa Lu (9,10) did not play.

6. All players who finished in the top-20 in the previous year's ANA Inspiration

Carlota Ciganda (8), Austin Ernst (8), Karine Icher (8), Ariya Jutanugarn (8), Moriya Jutanugarn (8), Pernilla Lindberg (7,8), Catriona Matthew (8), Stephanie Meadow, Gerina Piller (8,9), Jenny Shin (8), Angela Stanford (8)

7. All players who finished in the top-5 of the previous year's U.S. Women's Open, Women's PGA Championship, Ricoh Women's British Open and The Evian Championship

Ko Jin-young (9), Shiho Oyama, Jane Park (8)

8. Top-80 on the previous year's season-ending LPGA Tour official money list

Marina Alex, Baek Kyu-jung, Christel Boeljon, Chella Choi, Paula Creamer, Sandra Gal, Julieta Granada, Jaye Marie Green, Wei-Ling Hsu, Charley Hull, Ji Eun-hee, Danielle Kang, Kim Kaufman, In-Kyung Kim, Candie Kung, Min Seo Kwak, Brittany Lang, Alison Lee (9), Min Lee, Xi Yu Lin, Caroline Masson, Maria McBride, Sydnee Michaels, Ai Miyazato, Mika Miyazato, Azahara Muñoz, Ryann O'Toole, Pornanong Phatlum (9), Alena Sharp, Kelly Shon, Jennifer Song, Ayako Uehara, Mariajo Uribe, Sakura Yokomine

9. Top-30 on the Women's World Golf Rankings as of a March 8, 2016

Lee Bo-mee (10), Park Sung-hyun (10)

Ahn Sun-ju did not play.

10. Top-2 players from the previous year's season-ending Ladies European Tour Order of Merit, LPGA of Japan Tour money list and LPGA of Korea Tour money list

Melissa Reid

11. Top-20 players plus ties on the current year LPGA Tour official money list at the end of the last official tournament prior to the current ANA Inspiration, not otherwise qualified above, provided such players are within the top-80 positions on the current year LPGA Tour official money list at the beginning of the tournament competition

Cydney Clanton, Jacqui Concolino, Jodi Ewart Shadoff, Simin Feng, Tiffany Joh, Megan Khang, P.K. Kongkraphan, Gaby López, Annie Park, Paula Reto, Thidapa Suwannapura, Kelly Tan, Julie Yang

12. Previous year's Louise Suggs Rolex Rookie of the Year

13. Previous year's U.S. Women's Amateur champion, provided she is still an amateur at the beginning of tournament competition

Hannah O'Sullivan

14. Any LPGA Member who did not compete in the previous year's ANA Inspiration major due to injury, illness or maternity, who subsequently received a medical/maternity extension of membership from the LPGA in the previous calendar year, provided they were otherwise qualified to compete in the previous year's ANA Inspiration

Caroline Hedwall, Gwladys Nocera

15. Up to six sponsor invitations for top-ranked amateur players

Sierra Brooks, Karen Chung, Bronte Law, Andrea Lee, Leona Maguire, Albane Valenzuela

Course layout

Dinah Shore Tournament Course

Round summaries

First round
Thursday, March 31, 2016

Second round
Friday, April 1, 2016

Third round
Saturday, April 2, 2016

Final round
Sunday, April 3, 2016

Scorecard
Final round

References

External links

Coverage on the LPGA Tour official site

Chevron Championship
Golf in California
ANA Inspiration
ANA Inspiration
ANA Inspiration
ANA Inspiration
ANA Inspiration